Constituency NA-207 (Larkana-IV) was a constituency for the National Assembly of Pakistan. It was abolished in the 2018 delimitation as this constituency's area encompassed three districts: Larkana, Shikarpur, and Qambar Shadadkot. Now the major area of the constituency, which belonged to Larkana, is included in NA-200 (Larkana-I). The Qambar Shahdadkot area is in NA-202 (Qambar Shahdadkot-I) and the area belonging to Shikarpur is in NA-199 (Shikarpur-II).

Election 2002 

General elections were held on 10 Oct 2002. Shahid Hussain Bhutto of PPP won by 54,349 votes.

Election 2008 

General elections were held on 18 Feb 2008. Faryal Talpur of PPP won the seat.

Election 2013 

General election 2013 were held on May 11, 2013. The constituency is often called "The fort of the PPP" as the seat covers the native home of the former Prime Ministers Benazir Bhutto and Zulfiqar Ali Bhutto, Garhi Khuda Baksh. The seat was won by Ms. Faryal Talpur of the PPP in the 2013 general election who won this seat uncontested in 2008.

References

External links 
Election result's official website

NA-207
Abolished National Assembly Constituencies of Pakistan